Ragasiya Police 115 is a 1968 Tamil-language spy film, directed by B. R. Panthulu. The film stars M. G. Ramachandran (MGR) and J. Jayalalithaa, supported by M. N. Nambiar, S. A. Ashokan and Nagesh. It was released on 11 January 1968, and ran for 100 days in theatres, becoming hit at the box office.

Plot 

Upon his return from a particularly dangerous but successful mission abroad, Ramu, the secret agent 115 of Intelligence Bureau witnesses striking revelations about the reselling of classified information. Ramu suspects a rich family was involved in the crime. Ramu is sent to spy on the family, which is led by Dhanapal Mudaliar and his son Nambirajan.

Ramu leaves his hotel room, thwarting the "welcoming committee" which waits for him. At another location, a mother and daughter are seen comforting each other. They were Ramu's family, including his younger sister Parvathi and their blind mother. Parvathi is worried about Ramu, but given her mother's plight, she could not share the reason for her sorrow.

Cast 

Male cast
 M. G. R as Ramu
 M. N. Nambiar as Kumar
 Ashokan as Nambirajan
 Nagesh as Balakrishnan
 K. D. Santhanam as Dhanapal Mudaliar
 Rama Rao as Hotel Receptionist
 Thiruchi Soundararajan as Head of Secret Service
 Ennathai Kannaiah as Doctor
 N. S. Nataraj
 Thirupathisami as Singapuram
 Justin as Judoka

Female cast
 Jayalalithaa as Neela
 Vennira Aadai Nirmala as Kamala Devi
 Kumari Padmini as Parvathi
 Ammukutty Pushpamala as Nayaki
 S. N. Lakshmi as Kamakshi
 Pappamma

Support cast
 Raja, Usilai Mani, Kumar, Pasupathi, Dharmalingam, Kamakshi, Nataraj, Naveendran, Rangoon Rajammal, Indira.

Production 
Midway through the shooting of the film, Ramachandran was shot in the throat by M. R. Radha. Although he survived the attack, his voice was damaged, but he dubbed his own lines for the film.

Soundtrack 
The soundtrack was composed by M. S. Viswanathan.

Reception 
Kalki negatively reviewed the film, saying it had 115 flaws, though the critic appreciated Ashokan's performance.

References

External links 
 

1960s spy films
1960s Tamil-language films
1968 films
Films about the Research and Analysis Wing
Films directed by B. R. Panthulu
Films scored by M. S. Viswanathan
Indian spy films